Muribeca is a municipality located in the Brazilian state of Sergipe. Its population was 7,639 (2020) and its area is 79 km².

References

Municipalities in Sergipe